Craig Joiner (born 21 April 1974) is a Scottish retired rugby union player who won 25 caps playing on the wing for the Scottish rugby union side between 1994 and 2000.

Early life
Craig Joiner born on 21 April 1974 in Glasgow, Scotland. He was educated at Merchiston Castle School.

Rugby career
He joined Leicester Tigers, and often played at outside centre, but returned to Scotland in 2000. He joined Stewart's Melville RFC in 2005.

Personal life
He is the brother of racing cyclist Charline Joiner.

Joiner retired from professional rugby in 2015 to pursue a career in investment management.  He initially joined Cornelian Asset Managers where he undertook his professional qualifications before moving on to join Standard Life in 2010.

References

External links
 Craig Joiner on Sporting Heroes

1974 births
Living people
Scottish rugby union players
People educated at Merchiston Castle School
Leicester Tigers players
Alumni of Loughborough University
Scotland international rugby union players
Melrose RFC players
Edinburgh Rugby players
Stewart's Melville RFC players
Rugby union players from Glasgow
Rugby union centres